may refer to:

 Hakuryu (actor), Japanese actor
 a character from Saiyuki manga
 a character from Pokémon
 A character from Magi – The Labyrinth of Magic 
 JS Hakuryū (SS-503), a Japanese Sōryū-class submarine